Ladronellum mariannarum is a species of small air-breathing land snails, terrestrial pulmonate gastropod mollusks in the family Charopidae. This species is endemic to Guam.

References

Fauna of Guam
Ladronellum
Gastropods described in 1894
Taxonomy articles created by Polbot